Daan De Pever (born 17 January 1989) is a Belgian footballer who plays for RWDM Brussels.

References

External links
 Daan De Pever on Footballdatabase

1989 births
Living people
Belgian footballers
F.C.V. Dender E.H. players
K.S.V. Roeselare players
C.S. Visé players
Belgian Pro League players
Challenger Pro League players
Association football midfielders